Maurice Bompard may refer to:

 Maurice Bompard (painter) (1857–1936), French Orientalist painter
 Maurice Bompard (politician) (1854–1935), French diplomat and politician